Hakan Reçber (born 17 August 1999) is a Turkish taekwondo athlete. He is an Olympic bronze medalist  in the Men's 68 kg competition. He won the gold medal at the 2021 European Taekwondo Championships and 2022 European Taekwondo Championships on the bantamweight (-63 kg) category.

Career
Hakan Reçber brought Turkey its first medal at the Tokyo 2020 Olympics on Sunday. The 21-year-old taekwondoin beat Bosnia’s Nedzad Husic in the 68-kilogram third-place match at the Makuhari Messe Event Hall. Reçber made a great start to the tie, winning the first round 14-5, but the second and third round ended in a 3-3, 5-5 draw respectively. But the Turkish athlete secured the match with a total score of 22-13.

Hakan Reçber won the gold medal in the men's 63 kg event at the 2022 European Taekwondo Championships held in Manchester, England.
He clinched gold at the 2022 World Taekwondo Grand Prix. Reçber defeated Ali Alian from Sweden to take the top prize in Rome during the men's 68 kg event final. Hakan Recber first Turk to clinch gold in Grand Prix's male category.

He won the silver medal in the men's 68 kg event at the 2022 Mediterranean Games held in Oran, Algeria.

Tournament record

References

External links 
 

1999 births
Turkish male taekwondo practitioners
Living people
Sportspeople from Ankara
Mediterranean Games bronze medalists for Turkey
Mediterranean Games medalists in taekwondo
Competitors at the 2018 Mediterranean Games
Competitors at the 2022 Mediterranean Games
European Taekwondo Championships medalists
Taekwondo practitioners at the 2020 Summer Olympics
Olympic taekwondo practitioners of Turkey
Olympic bronze medalists for Turkey
Olympic medalists in taekwondo
Medalists at the 2020 Summer Olympics
Mediterranean Games silver medalists for Turkey
Islamic Solidarity Games medalists in taekwondo
Islamic Solidarity Games competitors for Turkey
21st-century Turkish people